Texas A&M University School of Law is an ABA-accredited law school located in downtown Fort Worth, Texas. It was formerly part of Texas Wesleyan University until it was acquired by Texas A&M University. The law school is a member of the Association of American Law Schools (AALS) and offers the Juris Doctor (J.D.) degree through its full-time and part-time programs. Students may also pursue a Master of Laws (LL.M.) or Master of Legal Studies (M.L.S.) degree either online or in-residence.

History 

Founded in 1989, the law school began as the Dallas/Fort Worth School of Law in Irving, Texas, and then became the Texas Wesleyan University School of Law in 1992. On June 26, 2012, Texas A&M University reached an agreement with Texas Wesleyan University under which it would take over ownership and operational control of the law school, to be renamed the Texas A&M University School of Law. The agreement became final on August 12, 2013, with Texas A&M purchasing the school and all its physical and licensing assets for $73 million. After the sale, Texas A&M University declined to re-issue Texas A&M diplomas to law school alumni, stating that A&M lacked the necessary accreditation to do so.

Academics 

Texas A&M confers the Juris Doctor degree upon students who satisfactorily complete 90 credit hours and the experiential, rigorous writing, and pro bono requirements. Concentrations include Business Law; Criminal Law, Justice & Policy; Dispute Resolution; Estate Planning; Family Law; Intellectual Property; Workplace Law; Energy Law; Environmental Law; and Water Law.

Since its acquisition by Texas A&M University, the law school has increased the size of the faculty by 30% while reducing the size of incoming classes, with an 8.4:1 student-faculty ratio in the 2016-17 academic year. It also boosted the overall scholarship budget by 65%.

Programs 
Through the Advocacy Program, students may compete in Moot Court (appellate advocacy), Mock Trial (trial advocacy) and Alternative Dispute Resolution (negotiation, mediation and arbitration).

The Texas A&M Law Fellowship is a student-run organization whose stated mission is to raise awareness of legal work in the public interest sector. It awards fellowships to students who work in public interest organizations during the summer with funds raised at the annual Law Fellowship Gala and Auction.

The legal clinics offered at the law school include the Community Development Clinic, Criminal Defense Clinic, Entrepreneurship Law Clinic, Family Law and Veterans Clinic, Immigrant Rights Clinic, Intellectual Property and Technology Law Clinic, Low Income Tax Clinic, and Wills and Estates Clinic. Students who are accepted into the clinic are supervised by practicing attorneys and a faculty supervisor. In 2014, the United States Patent and Trademark Office approved a clinic at the law school after the school had shown a strong intellectual property program. The school has expanded that program, doubling the faculty in 2015.

The law school also hosts honor societies including the Elliott Inn of Phi Delta Phi and the Order of the Coif.

Admissions 

Texas A&M was ranked among the most selective law schools in 2019, placing 37th nationally in a 24/7 Wall St. ranking based on overall acceptance rate, median LSAT, and median undergraduate GPA.  

Texas A&M accepted 18.41% of applicants for the 2021 first-year class. The median LSAT score is 163, and the median GPA is 3.84. Women make up 52% of the 2021 first-year class, minorities make up 33% of the class, and the average age is 24.

Tuition
As part of the transition from a private to a public institution, in 2015 the law school announced that it would offer in-state tuition beginning in the 2016-17 academic year, resulting in a reduction in tuition and fees for Texas residents. It also guaranteed a locked tuition rate to all students for up to four academic years.

For the 2021-2022 academic year, full-time resident tuition and fees are $32,634; for non-residents, tuition and fees are $48,618. In the 2020-2021 academic year, 92% of Texas A&M law students received a grant or scholarship with a median award of $27,000 for full-time students.

Rankings 
Texas A&M University is ranked 46th nationally in the 2023 edition of the U.S. News Rankings of Best Law Schools. For 2023, the school is also ranked 6th for its intellectual property law program and 4th for its dispute resolution program.

Texas A&M's overall U.S. News ranking has increased rapidly since 2015, when it was unranked. Between 1998 and 2020, the school experienced the largest increase of any law school to its academic reputation score. This score, based on a survey of law school faculties, is the largest single factor in the U.S. News rankings methodology. U.S. News has previously ranked the law school 149th (2016), 111th (2017), 92nd (2018), 80th (2019), 83rd (2020), 60th (2021), and 53rd (2022).

Bar exam 

First Time Bar Passage:

In 2020, Texas A&M had an overall first-time bar exam pass rate of 92.13%. That mark was third best among Texas law schools behind University of Texas School of Law (95.05%) and Texas Tech University School of Law (93.81%), while ahead of Baylor Law School (87.25%), University of Houston Law Center (86.06%), SMU Dedman School of Law (85.18%), South Texas College of Law (79.03%), St. Mary's University School of Law (70.41%), UNT Dallas College of Law (59.34%), and Texas Southern University Thurgood Marshall School of Law (51.74%).

In 2019, Texas A&M had an overall first-time bar exam pass rate of 90.32%. That mark was second best among Texas law schools behind University of Texas School of Law (93.29%), tied with Baylor Law School (90.32%), while ahead of SMU Dedman School of Law (86.51%), University of Houston Law Center (85.14%), Texas Tech University School of Law (82.09%), South Texas College of Law (76.63%), St. Mary's University School of Law (69.65%), UNT Dallas College of Law (69.48%), and Texas Southern University Thurgood Marshall School of Law (55.77%).

Ultimate Bar Passage:

Of all 2018 Texas A&M law graduates who took the bar, 94.78% ultimately passed the bar exam within two years of graduation. That mark was fourth best among Texas law schools behind University of Texas School of Law (97.06%), Texas Tech University School of Law (95.92%), and SMU Dedman School of Law (95.73%), while ahead of South Texas College of Law (94.38%), University of Houston Law Center (92.76%), Baylor Law School (91.23%), St. Mary's University School of Law (84.91%), UNT Dallas College of Law (80.74%), and Texas Southern University Thurgood Marshall School of Law (75.86%).

Of all 2017 Texas A&M law graduates who took the bar, 89.47% ultimately passed the bar exam within two years of graduation. That mark was fifth best among Texas law schools behind Baylor Law School (97.06%), University of Texas School of Law (96.78%), SMU Dedman School of Law (94.61%), and Texas Tech University School of Law (92.55%), while ahead of University of Houston Law Center (88.50%), UNT Dallas College of Law (87.18%), South Texas College of Law (85.50%), St. Mary's University School of Law (83.90%), and Texas Southern University Thurgood Marshall School of Law (79.69%).

Employment 
Class of 2020:

Out of 130 total graduates of the Class of 2020, 93.8% (or 122 graduates) obtained full-time, long-term employment for which bar passage was required or for which a J.D. was an advantage within 10 months of graduation. 80.8% (or 105 graduates) were employed in long-term, full-time, bar passage required jobs excluding solo practice. 5.4% (or 7 graduates) were unemployed and seeking work, pursuing an additional degree, or working in a non-professional, short term, or part-time job within 10 months of graduation.

Of those graduates, 4.6% (or 6 graduates) obtained federal clerkships, and 10.0% (or 13 graduates) obtained jobs at large law firms with more than 100 lawyers. 14.6% (or 19 graduates) obtained full-time, long-term public service positions in government or public interest.

Class of 2019:

Out of 130 total graduates of the Class of 2019, 92.3% (or 120 graduates) obtained full-time, long-term employment for which bar passage was required or for which a J.D. was an advantage within 10 months of graduation. 80.8% (or 105 graduates) were employed in long-term, full-time, bar passage required jobs excluding solo practice. 6.2% (or 8 graduates) were unemployed and seeking work, pursuing an additional degree, or working in a non-professional, short term, or part-time job within 10 months of graduation.

Of those graduates, 3.1% (or 4 graduates) obtained federal clerkships, and 7.7% (or 10 graduates) obtained jobs at large law firms with more than 100 lawyers. 19.2% (or 25 graduates) obtained full-time, long-term public service positions in government or public interest.

Class of 2018:

Out of 138 total graduates of the Class of 2018, 82.6% (or 114 graduates) obtained full-time, long-term employment for which bar passage was required or for which a J.D. was an advantage within 10 months of graduation. 65.9% (or 91 graduates) were employed in long-term, full-time, bar passage required jobs excluding solo practice. 11.6% (or 16 graduates) were unemployed and seeking work, pursuing an additional degree, or working in a non-professional, short term, or part-time job within 10 months of graduation.

Of those graduates, 2.2% (or 3 graduates) obtained federal clerkships, and 4.3% (or 6 graduates) obtained jobs at large law firms with more than 100 lawyers. 20.3% (or 28 graduates) obtained full-time, long-term public service positions in government or public interest.

Scholarly publications 
 Texas A&M Law Review
 Texas A&M Journal of Property Law

References

External links
 

Educational institutions established in 1989
Law schools in Texas
Universities and colleges in Fort Worth, Texas
Law
1989 establishments in Texas